Oleg Grigorievich Mityaev (19 February 1956) is a Russian bard, musician and actor.

He was awarded the People's Artist of Russia award in 2009. He is also a member of Russian Writers Union.

Mityaev is the author and first performer of the popular bard song So Good That All We... (1978).

Discography
1990 —  Let's Talk Together 
 1992 —   Now They Speak About Money, songs of Yuri Vizbor 
 1994 —  The Letter from Africa 
 1995 —  Bright Past 
 1996 —  Summer is a Little Life 
 1998 —  Brave, People, Summer Will Come Soon! 
 1999 — Best Songs 
 2000 —  Not Best Songs 
 2002 —  Neither Country, Not Churchyard..., lyrics by Joseph Brodsky 
 2002 —  Celestial Calculator or Lives of Wonderful People 
 2003 —    Concert in Kremlin, 2 CD 
 2005 —  Let's Talk Together! 25 Years Later 
 2005 —  The Smell of Snow 
 2006 —  Songs of Mityaev, in two parts 
 2007 —  Brave, People, Summer Will Come Soon!, re-issue 
 2007 —  Oleg Mityaev visiting Eldar Ryazanov, 2 CD 
 2008 —  New Collection. Best Songs of Oleg Mityaev 
 2008 —  There Will Be No Romance Anymore, CD+DVD  
 2009 —  Long Live Muse!, CD+DVD, lyrics by Alexandr Pushkin, music by David Tukhmanov   
 2011 —  Songs of Mityaev, the third part 
 2011 — The Forgotten Feeling

Songbooks
 1992 —  Let's Talk Together. Songs by Oleg Mityaev 
 1997 —  Songs 
 2000 — Songs 
 2000 —  Ferial Things 
 2001 —  Herbalist 
 2003 —  Bright Past: Lyrics with Music Sheets Application 
 2003 —  Eternal Story: Lyrics with Music Sheets Application
 2004 —  Let's Talk Together: Verses, Songs 
 2004 —  Summeris a little life: Verses and Songs 
 2005 —  Songs 2 
 2006 —  Songs 
 2009 — Celestial Calculator 
 2009 —  Same Dreams 
 2009 —  Verses about Love 
 2010 — Veins on Hardwood Arms

Videography

Films
  Two Hours with Bards (1987)
 Playing with Unknown (1988)
  Safari No.6 (1990)
  Killer (1990)
 Monologues on the Red Brick Background, or 20 Years Later (2007)

Live recordings
1998 —  So Good That All We..., on 2 videotapes 
1999 —  Songs of Our Century 
2001 —  Brave, People, Summer Will Come Soon! 
2002 —  Why Can't We Meet for So Long?, in two parts 
2003 —  Concert in Kremlin 
2004 —  Concert in Kremlin. Because of Doing Nothing 
2006 —  Concert on Ilmen Fest. Oleg Mityaev and Vladimir Kristovsky 
2007 —  Songs of Mityaev. Anniversary Concert in Kremlin 
2008 —  There Will Be No Romance Anymore, CD+DVD pack)
2009 —  Long Live Muse!, CD+DVD

References

External links

Russian bards
1956 births
Living people
People's Artists of Russia
Musicians from Chelyabinsk
Russian male actors
Russian male singer-songwriters
Russian National Music Award winners